Elizabethtown (Pennsylvania Dutch: Betzischteddel) is a borough in Lancaster County, Pennsylvania, United States. Small factories existed at the turn of the 20th century when the population in 1900 was 1,861. As of the 2020 census, the population of the borough was 11,639. Elizabethtown is commonly referred to in south-central Pennsylvania as "E-Town." This nickname is also used for the local college and high school.

History 
There are two stories about the origin of the town's name. In one version it is named after Elizabeth Reeby, wife of Michael Reeby who sold the first building lots here in about 1795. The officially accepted history is that, in 1753, Captain Barnabas Hughes acquired land and laid out a town, naming it for his wife, Elizabeth. The early settlers were primarily Scots-Irish and Pennsylvania Dutch.

Elizabethtown became a borough in 1827, and a railroad was built through the area in the 1830s. The town was primarily agricultural until the early 1900s, when the Klein Chocolate Company (now part of Mars, Inc.) and several shoe factories (the last of which closed in 1979) opened. Elizabethtown College was established in 1899, and the Masonic Homes (now the Masonic Village) followed in 1910.

After World War II, Elizabethtown grew rapidly, more than doubling its population between 1950 and 2000. Homes and businesses expanded into nearby farmland, making sprawl, farmland preservation, and revitalizing the downtown area important issues.

The Kreider Shoe Manufacturing Company was listed on the National Register of Historic Places in 1980.

Public officials

Borough council
The Elizabethtown Borough Council has six members representing three voting wards. Each council member is elected to a four-year term. They are responsible for setting policy in every aspect of the borough, including budgeting, public works, zoning, and ordinances.

Mayor
The mayor is elected to a four-year term and is responsible for overseeing the police department, as well as performing ceremonial duties. The mayor casts votes at borough council meetings only in the event of a tie. The current mayor is Chuck Mummert (R).

Councilmen
Mike Hershey - President (R)
Tom Shaud - 1st Ward (R)
Jeff McCloud - 2nd Ward (R)
Phil Clark - 3rd Ward (R)
Lanty W. Moss - 1st Ward (R)
Neil Ketchum - 2nd Ward (R)

State and federal
 State Representative: David Hickernell (R)
 State Senator: Ryan Aument (R)
 U. S. Representative: Lloyd Smucker (R)

Geography
Elizabethtown is located in northwestern Lancaster County at  (40.153207, -76.600431). Pennsylvania Route 230 passes through the center of town, leading northwest  to Harrisburg and southeast  to Mount Joy. Pennsylvania Route 283, a four-lane freeway, touches the northeast boundary of the borough and provides access from an interchange with PA 743. PA 283 leads southeast  to Lancaster and northwest the same distance to Harrisburg. PA 743 leads north  to Hershey and south  to Marietta.

The borough is drained primarily by Conoy Creek, which flows southwest to the Susquehanna River at Bainbridge.

The hardiness zone is 6b.

Government and infrastructure
The Pennsylvania Department of Corrections Training Academy is located in Mount Joy Township, near Elizabethtown.

Economy
Elizabethtown is home to Continental Press, White Oak Mills (an animal feed plant), Elizabethtown College, the Masonic Village, a large Mars Chocolate North America (a division of Mars, Incorporated) plant, Nordstrom’s east coast fulfillment center, and numerous smaller businesses.

Demographics

As of the census of 2000, there were 11,887 people, 4,271 households, and 2,703 families residing in the borough. The population density was 4,567.4 people per square mile (1,765.2/km2). There were 4,483 housing units at an average density of 1,722.5 per square mile (665.7/km2). The racial makeup of the borough was 96.32% White, 0.90% Black or African American, 0.18% Native American, 1.23% Asian, 0.04% Pacific Islander, 0.45% from other races, and 0.87% from two or more races. 1.45% of the population were Hispanic or Latino of any race.

There were 4,271 households, out of which 28.5% had children under the age of 18 living with them, 51.2% were married couples living together, 8.9% had a female householder with no husband present, and 36.7% were non-families. 30.8% of all households were made up of individuals, and 12.5% had someone living alone who was 65 years of age or older. The average household size was 2.31 and the average family size was 2.88.

In the borough the population was spread out, with 19.3% under the age of 18, 18.8% from 18 to 24, 26.7% from 25 to 44, 17.1% from 45 to 64, and 18.2% who were 65 years of age or older. The median age was 34 years. For every 100 females there were 82.2 males. For every 100 females age 18 and over, there were 78.5 males.

The median income for a household in the borough was $42,752, and the median income for a family was $52,214. Males had a median income of $35,764 versus $26,316 for females. The per capita income for the borough was $18,384. About 3.3% of families and 5.2% of the population were below the poverty line, including 6.7% of those under age 18 and 3.9% of those age 65 or over.

Education 
Public schools in the borough are part of the Elizabethtown Area School District. Mount Calvary Christian School is just outside the northern borough limits. Elizabethtown College, a private liberal arts institution, provides higher education.

Public library
The Elizabethtown Public Library is a member of the Library System of Lancaster County.

Public media 
Town newspaper 
 The Elizabethtown Advocate
'Radio
 WWEC 88.3 FM
 WPDC 1600 AM

 Transportation 

Elizabethtown is served by an Amtrak station, where all Keystone Service and Pennsylvanian'' trains stop. Bus service is provided by the Red Rose Transit Authority, which operates the Route 18 bus to Lancaster.

State routes PA-230, PA-241, and PA-743 run through the borough. The PA-283 freeway mostly bypasses the borough to the northeast, going through Mount Joy Township, but a small portion goes through the borough.

Sister city 
  Letterkenny, Ireland

Annual fair 
Elizabethtown hosts an annual fair to show off the local agriculture that has impacted the town since its founding. It has given families, friends, and tourists a fun and lively environment for over 40 years. The fair provides fundraising and a promotional tool for local churches, committees, and businesses. It is held in late August beside East High Elementary and Elizabethtown Brethren in Christ Church.

Notable people
 Nelson Chittum, former Major League Baseball pitcher
 Gene Garber, former Major League Baseball pitcher
 Paul Gottfried, political scientist
 Donald Kraybill, educator and author on Anabaptist groups, in particular the Amish

References

External links

 
 Elizabethtown Area Chamber of Commerce

Populated places established in 1753
Boroughs in Lancaster County, Pennsylvania
1753 establishments in Pennsylvania